The Spikers' Turf is a men's semi-professional volleyball league in the Philippines associated with the Sports Vision Management Group, Inc. (Sports Vision).

History 
The league had its beginnings in 2014, when the Shakey's V-League introduced a men's division during its 21st conference. The following year, Sports Vision decided to spin-off the men's division as a separate league, giving birth to the Spikers' Turf.

In late-2016, Sports Vision announced that the league be merged back in the 2017 season with the Shakey's V-League (which was renamed as the Premier Volleyball League; PVL). The men's division in the PVL ended with the 2018 PVL Collegiate Conference as its final tournament. The Spikers' Turf was revived on October 6, 2018 and was reestablished as a separate legal entity from  the PVL.

In 2020, Spikers' Turf began the process to turn to a professional league, after the PVL was given professional status by the national government's Games and Amusement Board in the same year. The league did not stage its 2020 season due to the COVID-19 pandemic. In March 16, 2021, Sports Vision president Ricky Palou bared that only three teams out of six - Cignal HD, PLDT and VNS - agreed to turn professional.

Teams

These are the current teams who will compete at the 2023 Spikers' Turf Open Conference.

Result summary 

Notes:

Champions 

 Note

MVP by conference

Conference MVP

2014 Inaugural – Jeffrey Jimenez (IEM)
2015 Open – Marck Espejo (Cagayan Valley)
2015 Collegiate – Marck Espejo (Ateneo)
2015 Reinforced – Mark Gil Alfafara (PLDT)
2016 Open – Gregorio Dolor (IEM)
2016 Collegiate – Marck Espejo (Ateneo)

2016 Reinforced – Howard Mojica (Air Force)
2018 Open – Bryan Bagunas (Sta. Elena-NU)
2019 Reinforced – Alnakran Abdilla (Air Force)
2019 Open – Ysrael Wilson Marasigan (Cignal)
2022 Open – Angelo Nicolas Almendras (NU-Sta. Elena)

Finals MVP

2014 Inaugural – Jeffrey Jimenez (IEM)
2015 Open – Mark Gil Alfafara (PLDT)
2015 Collegiate – Marck Espejo (Ateneo)
2015 Reinforced –  Edward Ybañez (Cignal)
2016 Open – Fauzi Ismail (Air Force)
2016 Collegiate – Antony Paul Koyfman (Ateneo)

2016 Reinforced – Bryan Bagunas (Air Force)
2018 Open – Alnakran Abdilla (Air Force)
2019 Reinforced – Marck Espejo (Cignal)
2019 Open – Marck Espejo (Cignal)
2022 Open – Michaelo Buddin (NU-Sta. Elena)

 Note

Notable records 
 Marck Espejo of the Cignal HD Spikers holds the record of highest number of scored points in a single game, 43 points (33 spikes, 2 blocks & 8 service aces).
 Previous record holder was Howard Mojica of the EAC Generals with 41 points (38 spikes, 1 block & 2 service aces) in a match against the Ateneo Blue Eagles during the quarter finals round of the 2015 collegiate conference - ref. Match 34 P2
 The Ateneo Blue Eagles made history in the Spikers' Turf by being the first team to sweep a conference (13 wins & 0 loss).

Venues 
 Blue Eagle Gym, Quezon City
 Filoil Flying V Centre, San Juan (Metro Manila)
 PhilSports Arena, Pasig
 Smart Araneta Coliseum, Quezon City
 Ynares Sports Arena, Pasig
 Paco Arena, Paco, Manila

Broadcast partners 
 People's Television Network (2015)
 Hyper (2018)
 One Sports (2019–present)

See also 
 Premier Volleyball League
 Shakey's Super League
 NCAA Volleyball Championship (Philippines)
 University Athletic Association of the Philippines
 UAAP Volleyball Champions
 Philippine Super Liga

References

External links 

 
Premier Volleyball League (Philippines)
Shakey's V-League
Volleyball competitions in the Philippines
Sports leagues established in 2015
2015 establishments in the Philippines
Professional sports leagues in the Philippines